Lady Mountain (previously known as Cliff Dwelling Mountain) is a  elevation Navajo Sandstone summit located in Zion National Park, in Washington County of southwest Utah, United States.

Description
It is set on the west side of the North Fork Virgin River which drains precipitation runoff from this mountain. Its neighbors include Mount Majestic, Cathedral Mountain, The Great White Throne, Red Arch Mountain, Mountain of the Sun, Mount Moroni, Castle Dome, and The Sentinel. This feature was called "Cliff Dwelling Mountain" and "Mount Zion" before the Lady Mountain name was officially adopted in 1934 by the U.S. Board on Geographic Names. It is so named for markings of which early visitors saw a resemblance to a lady's face. In 1925 the park service constructed a climbing "trail" with cables and ladders to the summit, one of the first in the park, but it was later deconstructed due to numerous rescues and fatalities.

Climate
Spring and fall are the most favorable seasons to visit Lady Mountain. According to the Köppen climate classification system, it is located in a Cold semi-arid climate zone, which is defined by the coldest month having an average mean temperature below , and at least 50% of the total annual precipitation being received during the spring and summer.

Gallery

See also

 List of mountains in Utah
 Geology of the Zion and Kolob canyons area
 Colorado Plateau

References

External links

 Zion National Park National Park Service
 Weather forecast: Lady Mountain
 Lady Mountain rock climbing: mountainproject.com

Mountains of Utah
Zion National Park
Mountains of Washington County, Utah
Sandstone formations of the United States
Colorado Plateau
North American 2000 m summits